Demetrio Nava (9 June 1758 - 23 September 1817) was an Italian jurist, priest, polymath, and historian.

Biography
He was born in Reggio di Calabria. After studying locally, he was named a canon in the Cathedral in his native city. Among his works are: 
Cronica delle cose memorabili di Reggio
De Saracenorum in Sicilia irruptione (of the Saracen capture of Sicily)
Lezioni populari su cose d'agricoltura (describes the cultivation and preparation of products from Reggio)
Dissertazione fisico-istorica su la cagioni e gli effetti del tremuoto
Gli Sconvolgimenti seguite in tutti la Calabria ultra per il tremuoto del 1783
Fata Morgana
Posizione ed istoria de Bagni de Ali
Descrizione storico-economico-politica dell'isola dell Favignana

References

1758 births
1817 deaths
18th-century Italian writers
18th-century Italian male writers
18th-century Italian historians
People from Calabria